Amberboa moschata (common name sweetsultan) is a Southwest Asian species of plants in the family Asteraceae. It is native to Turkey, Iraq, Iran, and the Caucasus. It is also widely cultivated in many places as an ornamental, and is reportedly naturalized in parts of China and North America.

Amberboa moschata is a branching herb up to 50 cm tall. Flower heads are usually purple, showy, and sweet-scented.

References

moschata
Plants described in 1753
Taxa named by Carl Linnaeus
Garden plants